"My Foolish Heart" is a popular song and jazz standard that was published in 1949. In the UK, the song reached No. 1 in the chart based on sales of sheet music, staying at the top spot for 11 weeks in 1950.

Overview
The music was composed by Victor Young, and the lyric was written by Ned Washington.  The song was introduced by the singer Martha Mears in the 1949 film of the same name.  The song failed to escape critics' general laceration of the film. Time wrote in its review that "nothing offsets the blight of such tear-splashed excesses as the bloop-bleep-bloop of a sentimental ballad on the sound track." Nevertheless, the song was nominated for the Academy Award for Best Original Song in 1949 but lost out to "Baby, It's Cold Outside" by Frank Loesser.

Cover versions
 The song was also a popular success, with two recordings of the song listed among the top 30 on the Billboard charts in 1950. Gordon Jenkins's recording of "My Foolish Heart", Sandy Evans, vocal, reached the Top Ten on the charts. However, Billy Eckstine's version became a million-seller, spending 19 weeks on the charts and peaking at number 6. Other successful versions in 1950 were by Mindy Carson, Margaret Whiting, Richard Hayes and by Hugo Winterhalter.
A contemporary British cover by Steve Conway was released on Columbia Records.
 Bing Crosby debuted his version on radio on The Bing Crosby – Chesterfield Show, broadcast Wednesday March 8, 1950.
 Bill Evans Trio on their 1962 live album, Waltz for Debby.
 The Demensions charted with an orchestral sophisticated doo-wop version in 1963 at #95, featuring the blended harmonies of Lenny Dell, Phil Del Giudice, Howie Margolin, and Marisa Martelli, in a unique arrangement with an added introductory stanza, directed by Henry Jerome, released on the Coral Records label.
 Connie Francis on her 1966 album Jealous Heart (MGM Records).
 John McLaughlin on his 1978 album Electric Guitarist (Columbia).
 Roberta Flack on her 1991 album Set the Night to Music, issued as the A-side and B-side#B-side to the single "You Make Me Feel Brand New"
 Susannah McCorkle on her 1992 album I'll Take Romance

References

External links
"My Foolish Heart" - Lead sheet at wikifonia.org

Songs with music by Victor Young
Songs with lyrics by Ned Washington
Songs written for films
1949 songs
1940s jazz standards